Nalawade may refer to:

Arun Nalawade, an Indian film and theater producer
Dattaji Nalawade, Indian politician 
Kishor Ashok Nalawade, (born 1972) Ex Indian actor, Senior Manager India Bulls Finance.
Ashok Yashwant Nalawade, (born 1947) Govt Officer Architecture and Design (roads and tunnels, bridges).
Kaustubh Kihor Nalawade, (born 2005) State Level Gold Medalist in swimming.
Santosh Tatyaba Nalawade ( born 1987) Director Transdrive Solutions Pvt Ltd 
Bharat Dattatray Nalawade, (born 1985) Business Analyst, Consultant USA